Thomas H. Hall (June 1773June 30, 1853) was a Congressional Representative from North Carolina; born in Prince George County, Virginia, in June 1773; studied medicine and practiced in Tarboro, North Carolina; elected as a Democratic-Republican to the Fifteenth Congress and reelected to the three succeeding Congresses (March 4, 1817 – March 3, 1825); unsuccessful candidate for reelection in 1824 to the Nineteenth Congress; elected to the Twentieth Congress and reelected as a Jacksonian to the three succeeding Congresses (March 4, 1827 – March 3, 1835); chairman, Committee on Expenditures in the Department of the Treasury (Twentieth Congress), Committee on Public Expenditures (Twenty-first and Twenty-second Congresses); resumed the practice of medicine and also engaged in agricultural pursuits; member of the State senate in 1836; died in Tarboro, North Carolina, on June 30, 1853; interment in Macnail-Hall Cemetery, near Tarboro, North Carolina.

See also 
Fifteenth United States Congress
Sixteenth United States Congress
Seventeenth United States Congress
Eighteenth United States Congress
Twentieth United States Congress
Twenty-first United States Congress
Twenty-second United States Congress
Twenty-third United States Congress

References

External links
Thomas H. Hall entry at The Political Graveyard

1773 births
1853 deaths
North Carolina state senators
People from Prince George County, Virginia
Democratic-Republican Party members of the United States House of Representatives from North Carolina
Jacksonian members of the United States House of Representatives from North Carolina
19th-century American politicians
People from Tarboro, North Carolina